Rothiemay railway station served the village of Milltown of Rothiemay, Aberdeenshire, Scotland from 1856 to 1968 on the Great North of Scotland Railway.

History 
The station was opened on 11 October 1856 by the Great North of Scotland Railway. It closed to both passengers and goods traffic on 6 May 1968.

References

External links 

Disused railway stations in Aberdeenshire
Former Great North of Scotland Railway stations
Railway stations in Great Britain opened in 1856
Railway stations in Great Britain closed in 1968
1856 establishments in Scotland
1968 disestablishments in Scotland